Caja Trujillo, is a Peruvian banking company centered in Trujillo city in the financial sector and currently It is the largest financial company locally, began to operate and provide services in 1985. Up to year 2012 this company has agencies service installed in different regions of the coast and highlands of the Peru providing financial attention mainly to small and medium entrepreneurs in the SME sector. According to a study published in 2010 by the magazine Peru Económico it is one representative mark of the city.

History
This is a financial institution owned by Municipality of Trujillo; As microfinance institution was founded on October 19, 1982, but in November 12, 1984 formally began operations in the financial sector. In 2012 the president of the Annual general meeting is Cesar Acuña Peralta the mayor of the city in the period 2011 - 2014.

Regional agencies
Caja Trujillo has agencies in the following regions of Peru:
Tumbes
Piura
Lambayeque
La Libertad
Ancash
Amazonas
Cajamarca
Lima
San Martín
Huánuco.
Huacho

Related Companies
SEDALIB, company of water supply and sanitation in La Libertad Region.
Municipality of Trujillo

See also

Historic Centre of Trujillo
Chan Chan
Huanchaco
Puerto Chicama
Chimu
Pacasmayo beach
Plaza de Armas of Trujillo
Moche
Víctor Larco Herrera District
Vista Alegre
Buenos Aires
Las Delicias beach
Independence of Trujillo
Wall of Trujillo
Santiago de Huamán
Lake Conache
Marinera Festival
Trujillo Spring Festival
Wetlands of Huanchaco
Association of Breeders and Owners of Paso Horses in La Libertad
Salaverry beach
Puerto Morín
Virú culture
Marcahuamachuco
Wiracochapampa

External links

Map of Trujillo (Wikimapia)
"Huaca de la luna and Huaca del sol"
"Huacas del Sol y de la Luna Archaeological Complex", Official Website
Information on El Brujo Archaeological Complex
Chan Chan World Heritage Site, UNESCO
Chan Chan conservation project
Website about Trujillo, Reviews, Events, Business Directory
Municipality of Trujillo

Multimedia
 
 
 
 Gallery pictures of Trujillo by Panoramio, Includes Geographical information by various authors
Colonial Trujillo photos

References

Companies based in Trujillo, Peru
Brands of Trujillo, Peru